Giovanni Colombini may refer to:

Blessed Giovanni Colombini (Founder of the Congregation of Jesuati) (c. 1300–1367)
Giovanni Colombini (painter) (c. 1700–1774), Italian painter of the late-Baroque or Rococo period